Jack Johnson (also known as A Tribute to Jack Johnson on reissues) is a studio album and soundtrack by American jazz trumpeter, composer, and bandleader Miles Davis. It was released on February 24, 1971, by Columbia Records.

The album was conceived by Davis for Bill Cayton's documentary of the same name, on the life of boxer Jack Johnson. Its two 25-minute-plus tracks were produced from recordings made on February 18 and April 7, 1970, at 30th Street Studio in New York City. Davis was inspired by the political and racial subtext of Johnson's saga as well as the hard rock and funk sounds of his own era, leading a rock-inspired line-up of musicians in the studio: guitarists John McLaughlin and Sonny Sharrock, keyboardists Herbie Hancock and Chick Corea, bass clarinetist Bennie Maupin, and drummers Jack DeJohnette and Billy Cobham.

Jack Johnson performed modestly on the record charts and was generally well received by contemporary critics. It has since been regarded as one of the best albums from Davis' career and the jazz-rock genre, as well as his most overt venture into rock music. In 2003, the original album was reissued as part of The Complete Jack Johnson Sessions, a five-disc box set featuring previously unreleased music from the recording sessions.

Background 

In 1970, Davis was asked by boxing promoter Bill Cayton to record music for a documentary he was producing, on the life of boxer Jack Johnson. Johnson's saga resonated personally with the musician, who wrote in the album's liner notes of Johnson's mastery as a boxer, his affinity for fast cars, jazz, clothes, and beautiful women, his unreconstructed blackness, and his threatening image of large black manhood to white men. The resulting album, Jack Johnson, was the second film score Davis had composed, after Ascenseur pour l'échafaud in 1957.

Recording and production
The music recorded for Jack Johnson reflected Davis' interest in the eclectic jazz fusion of the time while foreshadowing the hard-edged funk that would fascinate him in the next few years. Having wanted to put together what he called "the greatest rock and roll band you have ever heard", Davis played with a line-up featuring guitarists John McLaughlin and Sonny Sharrock, keyboardists Herbie Hancock and Chick Corea, bass clarinetist Bennie Maupin, and drummers Jack DeJohnette and Billy Cobham. The album's two tracks were mainly drawn from one session on April 7, 1970, which producer Teo Macero edited together with Davis' recordings from a February 18, 1969 "In A Silent Way" session

The first track, "Right Off", was constructed from several takes and a solo Davis had recorded in November 1969. It also contains a riff based on Sly and the Family Stone's "Sing a Simple Song", most prominently at 18:44. Much of the track "Yesternow" is built around a slightly modified version of the bassline from the James Brown song "Say It Loud – I'm Black and I'm Proud".

"Right Off" comprises a series of improvisations based on a B♭ chord, but changes after about 20 minutes to an E chord. "Yesternow" has a similar B♭ ostinato and shifts to C minor. It concludes with a voiceover by actor Brock Peters: "I'm Jack Johnson, heavyweight champion of the world. I'm black. They never let me forget it. I'm black all right. I'll never let them forget it." Liner notes accompanying a later release of the album provide a description of the music:

According to The Guardians Tim Cumming, Jack Johnson abandoned jazz and the broad textures of Bitches Brew in favor of a concerted take on hard rock and funk, inspired as well by politics, the black power movement, and boxing. "[Davis] had a trainer who travelled with the band", Holland recalled. "He used to go to the gym every day. He was in his 40s, and that's prime time for musicians, when you're strong and all your faculties are there. He was playing incredibly." Ken McLeod, an associate professor of music history and culture at the University of Toronto, later said the bassline featured on "Yesternow" (and adapted from James Brown's “Say It Loud—I'm Black and I'm Proud”) is "potentially a deliberate allusion to the song's black power theme as it relates to the film's subject. That Davis was so influenced by boxing is also overtly manifest in the titles of pieces named after fighters that were recorded at several of the sessions, both before and after those that resulted in Jack Johnson. Such pieces include 'Johnny Bratton,' 'Archie Moore,' 'Duran,' 'Sugar Ray,' and 'Ali.'"

Release and reception 

Jack Johnson was released on February 24, 1971, by Columbia Records to some commercial success—peaking at number four on Billboard magazine's jazz chart and at number 47 on the R&B chart—despite little marketing from the label. According to Davis, the record was originally released with the wrong cover: a depiction of Johnson in his car, illustrated in stylized period fashion. The intended cover—a photo of Davis playing trumpet in a bent-backward stance—was used on subsequent pressings, which were titled A Tribute to Jack Johnson. In 2003, the album was included on The Complete Jack Johnson Sessions, a five-disc box set featuring previously unreleased music from the original recording sessions.

Reviewing the album in June 1971 for The Village Voice, rock critic Robert Christgau gave Jack Johnson an A-plus and said it is his favorite recording from Davis since Milestones (1958) and Kind of Blue (1959). While finding it lacking in the excitement of the best moments from Bitches Brew, Christgau believed the album coalesces its predecessor's "flashy ideas" into "one brilliant illumination." Steve Starger of The Hartford Courant called the album "magnificent" and "another gem" in Davis' 20-year "string of gems", and wrote that the tracks "really make up one long, churning, steaming, brooding, slashing musical experience that never dips below the highest of art." Starger found the sidemen's performances masterful and said that Peters' voiceover at the end gives "Johnson's words frightening majesty".

Less enthusiastic about the record was jazz musician and journalist Leonard Feather, who wrote a review for the Los Angeles Times titled "Miles Ahead and Miles Behind". Viewing Jack Johnson as a "letdown after the unflawed triumph" of Bitches Brew, Feather was particularly dismayed by Davis for aligning himself with "the thumping, clinking, whomping battering ram that passes for a rhythm section" on the album.

Legacy and reappraisal 

Jack Johnson was a turning point in Davis' career and has since been viewed as one of his greatest works. According to JazzTimes, while his 1970 album Bitches Brew had helped spark the fusion of jazz and rock in the music scene, Jack Johnson was the trumpeter's most brazen and effective venture into rock, "the one that blew the fusion floodgates wide open, launching a whole new genre in its wake". According to McLaughlin, Davis considered it to be his best jazz-rock album. In The Penguin Guide to Jazz (2006), Richard Cook says Jack Johnson "stands at the head of what was to be Miles Davis's most difficult decade, artistically and personally", while Tom Hull names it one of the "true highlights" of the trumpeter's electric period and among his best albums. The Boston Herald cites it as one of Davis' "last truly great albums" and as "some of the most powerful and influential jazz-rock ever played."

Critics in retrospective appraisals also note the uniqueness of Davis' playing and the crucial contributions of his band and producer on the album. AllMusic's Thom Jurek highlights its "funky, dirty rock & roll jazz" and "chilling, overall high-energy rockist stance". He also calls it "the purest electric jazz record ever made because of the feeling of spontaneity and freedom it evokes in the listener, for the stellar and inspiring solos by McLaughlin and Davis that blur all edges between the two musics, and for the tireless perfection of the studio assemblage by Miles and producer Macero". John Fordham from The Guardian observes a transition in Davis's playing from a "whispering electric sound to some of the most trenchantly responsive straight-horn improvising he ever put on disc". According to Fordham:

Jack Johnson and Davis' other electric-period albums influenced rock musician Iggy Pop's early music with the Stooges. Around 1985, he purchased copies of Davis' Sketches of Spain (1960) and Jack Johnson in a no frills used record shop for less than $5. "They have been my inspiring companions ever since", he told The Quietus in 2010. "The one tears me apart and the other puts me back together."

Track listing
All songs were composed by Miles Davis.

Personnel 
The information below is taken from Sony Music's milesdavis.com.

The following lineup was recorded at Columbia Studios, New York, April 7, 1970:
 Miles Davis – trumpet
 Steve Grossman – soprano saxophone
 John McLaughlin – electric guitar
 Herbie Hancock – organ
 Michael Henderson – electric bass
 Billy Cobham – drums
 Brock Peters – narration

Additionally, the following participants were credited for roles outside the band:

 Teo Macero – conduction of "unknown orchestra", production
 Stan Tonkel – engineering
 Miles Davis – compositions

The following lineup, recorded at Columbia Studios, February 18, 1970, was uncredited on the original LP and are only heard on a section of "Yesternow" (from 14:00 to 23:55) playing a composition called "Willie Nelson":

 Miles Davis – trumpet
 Bennie Maupin – bass clarinet
 John McLaughlin – electric guitar
 Sonny Sharrock – electric guitar
 Chick Corea – electric piano
 Dave Holland – electric bass
 Jack DeJohnette – drums

Charts

See also
 The Complete Jack Johnson Sessions, a 2003 compilation boxset of the sessions which produced the Jack Johnson album

References

Bibliography

Further reading 
 Biron, Dean (2017). "My Favourite Album: A Tribute to Jack Johnson". The Conversation.
 
 Smith, Jeremy A. (2008). "Sound, Mediation, and Meaning in Miles Davis's A Tribute to Jack Johnson". PhD Diss: Duke University.
 Tingen, Paul. "The Making of Jack Johnson". Miles Beyond.

External links
 

1971 albums
Albums produced by Teo Macero
Albums recorded at CBS 30th Street Studio
Columbia Records albums
Jazz fusion albums by American artists
Legacy Recordings albums
Miles Davis albums
Tribute albums to non-musicians
Cultural depictions of Jack Johnson